And There Were Giants is a 1927 novel by Scottish writer Bruce Marshall.

References

1927 British novels
Novels by Bruce Marshall